Georgi Vasilev may refer to:

Georgi Vasilev (footballer, born 1945), Bulgarian footballer (forward) who competed at the 1968 Summer Olympics
 Georgi Vasilev (footballer, born 1946), Bulgarian football player (midfielder) and manager